Rockford Township is a township in Pottawattamie County, Iowa, USA.

History
Rockford Township is named from a rock-bottomed ford in the Boyer River.

References

Townships in Pottawattamie County, Iowa
Townships in Iowa